Ikri is a village in Ikri Union of Bhandaria Upazila, which is in the Pirojpur District of the Barisal Division of southwestern Bangladesh.

References

Populated places in Pirojpur District